Richardson Building may refer to:

in Canada
 Richardson Building (Winnipeg)

in New Zealand
Richardson Building, a building of the University of Otago in Dunedin which houses the University of Otago Faculty of Law

in the United States
Richardson Block, Boston, Massachusetts, listed on the National Register of Historic Places (NRHP) in Massachusetts
Richardson Building (Union City, Oklahoma), listed on the NRHP in Oklahoma